Yakshagana (lit. "Songs of the demi-gods") is a composite folk-dance-drama or folk theater of southern India which combines literature, music, dance and painting. The best-known forms of this art, written in the Kannada language, are from the Dakshina Kannada, Udupi district, Uttara Kannada and to some extent from the Shimoga district of modern Karnataka. According to the Kannada playwright and Yakshagana researcher Shivarama Karanth, there are over one hundred such plays written in Kannada in the past few centuries though not more than fifty have been staged and gained popularity. The metrical forms used to compose these plays are usually native Kannada forms such as dvipadi (couplet, 2-line verse), caupadi (4-line verse), sangatya (also 4-line) and three or four types of shatpadi (6-line verse). Some Sanskritic metrical forms, such as the vrattas (4 line verse) and kandas (chapter) were also used for composition. The composed lines lend themselves to tala (beats) and are hence suitable for dance-dramas.

There are a variety of dance-dramas collectively termed as Yakshagana. The Yakshagana Tenkutittu (lit. "Yakshagana of the southern style") is popular primarily in the Mangalore region and the Yakshagana Badagatittu Bayalaata (lit. "Yakshagana of northern style performed outdoors") is popular in Udupi and surrounding regions. Other art forms also grouped under Yakshagana are the Nagamandalam, a dance meant to appease the deity Naga, and a variety of bhuta (spirit) dances. The "Yakshagana Tenkutittu" is more akin to the classical Kathakali of Kerala. According to Karanth, the region between Udupi and Ikkeri could be where the Yakshagana of the northern style originated. Based on internal evidence, Karanth dates these plays to about a 100 years prior to their earliest available copy. This list is not exhaustive. Many plays never reached the stage and among those that did, several plays may not have gained popularity or may longer be popular. Aliya Lingaraja, a member of the Mysore royal family and a writer in the Mysore court wrote more than forty plays which are not in this list.

From about the 1960s, the Kannada Yakshaganas of the Tenkutittu style (southern style) have been replaced almost entirely by the Tulu language. According to Muthukumaraswamy and Kaushal this appears to be a form of "protest" against playing the traditional themes in Kannada taken from classical sources and a  preference for local folk themes in Tulu language.

The list

Notes

References

Kannada literature
Indian literature
Literature of Karnataka